Staples Township is a township in Todd County, Minnesota, United States. The population was 622 at the 2000 census.

Staples Township was organized in 1882, and named for Samuel and Isaac Staples, businessmen in the lumber industry.

Geography
According to the United States Census Bureau, the township has a total area of 33.9 square miles (87.7 km); 32.7 square miles (84.7 km) is land and 1.1 square miles (3.0 km) (3.40%) is water.

Demographics
As of the census of 2000, there were 622 people, 233 households, and 172 families residing in the township.  The population density was 19.0 people per square mile (7.3/km).  There were 274 housing units at an average density of 8.4/sq mi (3.2/km).  The racial makeup of the township was 96.46% White, 0.16% African American, 1.29% Native American, 0.16% Asian, and 1.93% from two or more races. Hispanic or Latino of any race were 1.13% of the population.

There were 233 households, out of which 29.2% had children under the age of 18 living with them, 63.9% were married couples living together, 7.3% had a female householder with no husband present, and 25.8% were non-families. 21.5% of all households were made up of individuals, and 9.4% had someone living alone who was 65 years of age or older.  The average household size was 2.67 and the average family size was 3.11.

In the township the population was spread out, with 23.3% under the age of 18, 10.3% from 18 to 24, 24.6% from 25 to 44, 26.5% from 45 to 64, and 15.3% who were 65 years of age or older.  The median age was 41 years. For every 100 females, there were 109.4 males.  For every 100 females age 18 and over, there were 109.2 males.

The median income for a household in the township was $40,469, and the median income for a family was $47,583. Males had a median income of $28,250 versus $16,827 for females. The per capita income for the township was $15,711.  About 5.2% of families and 6.3% of the population were below the poverty line, including 7.5% of those under age 18 and 2.0% of those age 65 or over.

References

Townships in Todd County, Minnesota
Townships in Minnesota